James Hutchinson (born January 24, 1953) is an American session bassist best known for his work with Bonnie Raitt. Though his work takes him nearly everywhere he primarily resides in Studio City, Los Angeles, CA and Haiku-Pauwela, Hawaii.

Hutchinson has worked on hundreds of recordings with artists as diverse as Willie Nelson, Joe Cocker, Ryan Adams, Bryan Adams, Jackson Browne, Ruth Brown, Charles Brown, Al Green, B.B. King, Earl King, The Neville Brothers, The Doobie Brothers, Ringo Starr, Ziggy Marley and many more.

Career

Early years 
Hutchinson attended some classes at Berklee College of Music in the late 1960s. He always had an affinity for music and practiced various instruments as a child. After seeing Wilson Pickett's band, at age 12, he focused on the bass. His talent and drive allowed him the opportunity to play in a variety of New England bands throughout high school.

With his mother's blessing, he moved to San Francisco after completing high school. He eventually met John Cipollina of Quicksilver Messenger Service and Mickey Hart of the Grateful Dead. He participated in many sessions at Mickey's Ranch. Hutchinson joined Cipollina's band, Copperhead. He recorded an album with them in 1973 on Columbia Records. Later, he played in Link Wray's band with Copperhead drummer, David Weber, and performed with both Wray and Cipollina.

Breakthrough 
While living in Guatemala, Hutchinson worked in a multitude of Central American studios. He and violinist Sid Page formed a Latin jazz fusion group called The Point. After he brought the band to Austin, Texas, they would win Jazz Group of the year at the Austin Music Awards in 1977. Meanwhile, in Austin in 1975, he was introduced to The Meters by a mutual friend. He later got a call from Charles and Art Neville about playing with their new band. He then moved to New Orleans and joined The Neville Brothers Band. While playing with the Neville Brothers on the Rolling Stones 1981 Tattoo You, tour he started a friendship with keyboardist Ian McLagan who introduced him to Bonnie Raitt in 1982. He moved to Los Angeles in 1983 and joined her band after her previous bassist left right before a tour. He has been playing and recording with her ever since, contributing to every recording of hers since Nine Lives.

In 1992, while working in the studio with Bryan Adams in Paris, Hutchinson was invited by producer Don Was and Mick Jagger to head to Ron Wood's farm and studio in County Kildare, Ireland, to play and work on demos for the Voodoo Lounge record which he did as reported in the New York Post.

Later years 
In 2006, Hutchinson was featured along with drummer Jim Keltner on the Jerry Lee Lewis recording Last Man Standing. Later that year he played shows with Bonnie Raitt opening for the Rolling Stones in Las Vegas, Los Angeles and Vancouver BC.

In 2008, Hutchinson participated in the production of the album Psalngs, the debut release of Canadian musician John Lefebvre. He also in 2008 worked on Blues recordings by Mike Zito, Walter Trout and Maria Muldaur as well as working with slack key guitarist Barry Flanagan of the Hawaiian pop band HAPA and touring in March of that year with Steve Kimock and Friends featuring Jerry Garcia Band keyboardist Melvin Seals.

On February 2, 2009, Hutchinson performed as bassist and co-music director (along with Chuck Leavell) at the Surf Ballroom in Clear Lake, Iowa, with an all-star band featuring Rolling Stones keyboard player Chuck Leavell, Stones sax man Bobby Keys, drummer Kenny Aronoff and Buddy Holly/Bob Wills guitarist Tommy Allsup at the Rock and Roll hall Of Fame's "50 Winters Later" concert in tribute to Buddy Holly, Ritchie Valens and the Big Bopper. During the summer of 2009, Hutchinson joined BK3, a band led by Grateful Dead drummer Bill Kreutzmann, and completed a tour with them. Later in the summer of 2009 and through the fall of that year, Hutchinson toured with Bonnie Raitt and Taj Mahal playing with both artists on The BonTaj Roulet tour.

On New Year's Eve 2009, he performed with Willie Nelson and his sons Lukas and Micah, along with special guest Alanis Morissette at Charley's in Paia, Maui, Hawaii.

In 2010 he completed a North American tour with the Hawaiian band Hapa, starting with them at Club Passim in Cambridge, Massachusetts, on St. Partick's Day 2010 and finishing on April 17 that year at The Maui Arts and Cultural Center.

On April 10, 2011, Hutchinson along with Maui residents Willie Nelson, Mick Fleetwood, Michael McDonald, and Pat Simmons performed together, along with Hawaiian artists Jack Johnson, Jake Shimabukuro, Cecilio & Kapono and many others on The Great Lawn of the Hawaiian Gardens in Honolulu at the benefit, Kokua For Japan. The concert and telethon raised $1.6 million for the American Red Cross and the survivors of the March 2011 earthquake, tsunami and resulting nuclear disaster in Japan.

On August 13, 2013, Hutchinson was featured along with drummer Steve Gadd and guitarist Joe Caro at the Paia Jam in Paia, Maui, Hawaii. In late October, once again between legs of Raitt's Slipstream tour, Hutchinson along with Ricky Fataar returned to Hawaii for a pair of Halloween-themed shows with Allen Toussaint. The Oahu shows also featured Hawaiian musicians John Cruz and Imua Garza.

In July 2014, after finishing Raitt's summer tour, Hutchinson appeared on a number of west and east coast dates with Pegi Young and her band the Survivors (featuring Muscle Shoals writer and keyboard man Spooner Oldham) culminating with an appearance at the 2014 Newport Folk Festival. On October 25 and 26, 2014, Hutchinson appeared once again with Pegi Young and the Survivors at the Bridge School Benefit Concert at Shoreline Amphitheatre. The same year Hutchinson was also featured on Neil Diamond's Melody Road, Looking Into You: A Tribute to Jackson Browne (w/David Lindley and Bonnie Raitt), Jerry Lee Lewis' Rock and Roll Time, and the Grouch & Eligh's The Tortoise and the Crow.

In 2015, Hutchinson once again toured with Raitt and on August 6, 2015, performed at Fenway Park in Boston with Raitt and James Taylor. The same year he played bass on Karen Lovely's album, Ten Miles of Bad Road. The following year, he played bass on Raitt's Dig In Deep and toured extensively in support the album. He also appeared on This Mountain, an EP by Pat Simmons Jr. which was produced by Patrick Simmons of the Doobie Brothers.

Hutchinson toured in 2017 with Raitt in Australia, New Zealand, Canada and throughout North America, including July–August with James Taylor. He also appeared on recordings by Curtis Salgado, Deb Ryder, Johnny Ray Jones, and others. In November he conducted a clinic at Bass Player Live, produced by Bass Player magazine and held annually at Studio Instrument Rentals in Hollywood. On New Year's Eve 2017 he performed again at Shep Gordon and Alice Cooper's Maui Food Bank Benefit in Wailea, Hawaii, playing with Steve Cropper, Dave Mason, Michael McDonald, Pat Simmons, Ray Benson, Glen Sobel, and others.

During 2018 Hutchinson toured the US extensively with Raitt, and in Europe with Raitt and Taylor. On July 15 they performed along with Paul Simon in Hyde Park, London, for a crowd in excess of 70,000 before heading off to Italy where they performed in the ancient amphitheater in Pompeii. He finished the year once again on Maui performing with friends at Shep Gordon's Annual Maui Food Bank Benefit.

In 2019 Taylor and Raitt once more hit the road early in the year. Raitt and her band were featured performers for the third year in a row at The New Orleans Jazz & Heritage Festival as well as doing a series of their own dates including The Willie Nelson Outlaw Tour which culminated at Farm Aid held that year at the Alpine Valley Music Theatre in Wisconsin. Hutchinson also in May 2019 appeared with the band Moonalice on a number of Northern California dates including the BottleRock Napa Valley Festival on Memorial Day. Shortly thereafter Hutchinson was a featured Artist in the Playing for Change video "The Weight" along with Ringo Starr, Robbie Robertson, and others. Hutchinson once again finished the year performing at Shep's Maui Food Bank Benefit performing once again with "The Doobie Ohana" and other artists Dave Mason, Nathaniel Rateliff and Lukas Nelson.

While working in the studio in early 2020 with Bonnie Raitt, Hutchinson appeared at Phil Lesh's Terrapin Crossroads in San Rafael, California, with the band Doobie Decimal System fronted by Roger McNamee and featuring multi-instrumentalist Jason Crosby. 2020 also saw the creation of Hokolele Studios in Haiku, Maui and collaborations with a number of artists in the US and overseas including Holly Lerski, David Knopfler, Marcia Ball, Gary Nicholson, Duke Levine, Patrick Simmons and others.

In 2021 he released a joint single and video entitled "Mighty Big Sur" with UK folk-rock singer Holly Lerski (formerly of the band Angelou) on which he wrote the music and played all of the instruments aside from the keyboards (performed by Glenn Patscha). He also recorded another record with Bonnie Raitt, (their 11th together) entitled Just Like That....
He also played both upright and electric bass on David Knopfler's Shooting for the Moon LP and electric bass on LP Fresh Bear Tracks by Richard T. Bear.

In 2022, Hutchinson has been touring the US with Bonnie Raitt in support of the album Just Like That... which debuted at number one on 6 different Billboard charts and sat atop the Americana charts for months after its release in April 2022. They continue to tour the US and are heading as well to the UK, Ireland, Canada and Australia in 2023.

Influences
Some of Hutchinson's main influences are Percy Heath, Paul Chambers, Chuck Rainey, Carl Radle, Klaus Voormann, Tommy Cogbill, Rick Danko, George Porter Jr., John Entwistle, Carol Kaye, and Jack Casady.

Partial discography

With Bonnie Raitt
 Nick of Time (Capitol Records, 1989)
 Luck of the Draw (Capitol Records, 1991)
 Longing in Their Hearts (Capitol Records, 1994)
 Fundamental (Capitol Records, 1998)
 Silver Lining (Capitol Records, 2002)
 Souls Alike (Capitol Records, 2005)
 Slipstream (Redwing Records, 2012)
 Dig In Deep (Redwing Records, 2016)
 Just Like That... (Redwing Records, 2022)

With Jackson Browne
 I'm Alive (Elektra Records, 1993)

With Neil Diamond
 Melody Road (Capitol Records, 2014)

With Delbert McClinton
 Never Been Rocked Enough (Curb, 1992)
 One of the Fortunate Few (Rising Tide, 1997)
 Nothing Personal (New West, 2001)

With Etta James
 Seven Year Itch (Island Records, 1989)

With Keb' Mo'
 Keb' Mo' (Epic Records, 1994)
 Just like You (Epic Records, 1996)

With Willie Nelson
 Across the Borderline (Columbia Records, 1993)

With Joe Cocker
 Organic (550 Music, 1996)
 Across from Midnight (CMC International, 1997)

With Crosby, Stills & Nash
 After the Storm (Atlantic Records, 1994)

With Taj Mahal
 Phantom Blues (RCA Victor, 1996)

With Bob Seger
 The Fire Inside (Capitol Records, 1991)

With Garth Brooks
 The Life of Chris Gaines (Capitol Records, 1999)

With Ringo Starr
 Time Takes Time (Private Music, 1992)

With Johnny Rivers
 Last Train to Memphis (Soul City, 1998)

With Randy Newman
 Randy Newman's Faust (Reprise Records, 1995)

With Roy Orbison
 King of Hearts (Virgin Records, 1992)

With Anne Murray
 Anne Murray (EMI, 1996)

With Marc Cohn
 The Rainy Season (Atlantic Records, 1993)

With Pieta Brown
 In the Cool (Valley Entertainment, 2005)

With Tim Easton
 Break Your Mother's Heart (New West Records, 2003)

With Terry Evans
 Blues for Thought (Point Blank Records, 1994)

With Elton John
 Duets (Geffen, 1993)

With Brian Wilson
 I Just Wasn't Made for These Times (MCA Records, 1995)

With Paul Young
 The Crossing (Columbia Records, 1993)

With Boz Scaggs
 Some Change (Virgin Records, 1994)
 Fade Into Light (MVP Japan, 1996)
 Come on Home (Virgin Records, 1997)
 Out of the Blues (Concord Records, 2018)

With Ivan Neville
 If My Ancestors Could See Me Now (Polydor Records, 1988)
 Thanks (Iguana Records, 1995)
 Saturday Morning Music (UpTop Entertainment, 2002)
 Scrape (Evangeline Recorded Works, 2004)

With Ziggy Marley and the Melody Makers
 Spirit of Music (Elektra Records, 1999)

With Colin James
 Bad Habits (Warner Music Canada, 1995)
 Limelight (MapleMusic Recordings, 2005)
  15 (EMI Records, 2012)

With Pops Staples
 Peace to the Neighborhood (Point Blank Records, 1992)

With Felix Cavaliere
 Dreams in Motion (MCA Records, 1994)

With Linda Ronstadt
 We Ran (Elektra Records, 1998)

With Crosby, Stills, Nash & Young
 Looking Forward (Atlantic Records, 1999)

With Maria Muldaur
 Meet Me at Midnite (Black Top Records, 1994)
 Fanning The Flames (Telarc, 1996)
 Southland Of The Heart (Telarc, 1998)

With B.B. King
 Deuces Wild (MCA Records, 1997)

With Eric Burdon
 My Secret Life (SPV, 2004)
 Soul of a Man (SPV, 2006)

With Ryan Adams
 Love Is Hell (Lost Highway Records, 2004)

With Jann Arden
 Happy (A&M Records, 1997)

With Richie Sambora
 Undiscovered Soul (Mercury Records, 1998)

References

External links
 Link to Hutchinson's bio on Bonnie Raitt's website

Living people
1953 births
Musicians from Cambridge, Massachusetts
Musicians from Somerville, Massachusetts
Guitarists from Massachusetts
American male bass guitarists
BK3 members
Copperhead (band) members
20th-century American bass guitarists
20th-century American male musicians